Songs in Ordinary Time is a 2000 American made-for-television drama film starring Sissy Spacek and Beau Bridges. The film was written by Malcolm MacRury and directed by Rod Holcomb. It  is an adaptation of the book Songs in Ordinary Time written by Mary McGarry Morris. Songs in Ordinary Time was entirely shot in Nova Scotia, Canada due to financial reasons. The film originally premiered on CBS on October 22, 2000.

Premise
Set in Vermont in the 1960s, the film revolves around of Mary Fermoyle, a divorced woman with three children to raise, who allows the secretive Omar Duvall enter her life. Duvall, however, may hide a huge secret.

Cast
 Sissy Spacek as Mary Fermoyle
 Beau Bridges as Omar Duvall
 Keir Dullea as Sam Fermoyle
 Tom Guiry as Norman Fermoyle
 Careena Melia as Alice Fermoyle
 Jordan Warkol as Ben Fermoyle
 Angelica Torn as Astrid Haddad

Reception
British website The Movie Scene gave the film three out of five stars. The reviewer critiqued almost every aspect of the movie, but Spacek and Bridges performances, stating: "Songs in Ordinary Time" is one of those movies which to be truthful is not very interesting, it is the sort of movie which plays out in front of your eyes and before you know it you are halfway through and you don't know how you got there. But in a way the reason why you get lost in "Songs in Ordinary Time" is because of who is in it as Sissy Spacek and Beau Bridges deliver such wonderful characters that you get caught up in their performances rather than what is going on."

References

External links
 
 

2000 television films
2000 films
2000 drama films
CBS network films
American drama television films
Films about con artists
Films based on American novels
Films directed by Rod Holcomb
Films scored by Anthony Marinelli
Films set in the 1960s
Films set in Vermont
Films shot in Nova Scotia
Television films based on books
TriStar Pictures films
2000s American films
2000s English-language films
English-language drama films